Najiba Ahmad (born 1954) (Kurdish:نه‌جیبە ئه‌حمه‌د, Necîbe Ehmed; pronounced ) is a contemporary Kurdish writer, poet, and translator

Life and career

Ahmad was born in northern city of Kirkuk in 1954. She studied Kurdish language and literature at the University of Sulaimaniya and worked as a teacher for many years before joining the Kurdish liberation movement. At the time when she began writing poetry, she was the only female Kurdish literary figure. 

Along with a handful of female Kurdish poets and writers, including Kajal Ahmad (b. 1967) and Mahabad Qadragi (b. 1966), she is regarded as making a significant contribution to the development of Kurdish literature.

Work 

She has published three volumes of her short stories and of her poetry and her work is also included in anthologies such as An Anthology of Modern Kurdish Literature  She has also translated poetry from Arabic and Persian to Kurdish and written literary articles, novels, short stories, drama, and literary works for children.

Selected publications
Spring Weeping, Tabriz, Iran, 1994.
 Rasan (short stories) Tabriz, Iran, 1994.
 History of the Apple-tree, Hawler, Iraqi Kurdistan, 1998.
 The Butterflies of Death (short stories), Hawler, Iraqi Kurdistan 1998.
 A Deer Created of Water, Hawler, Iraqi Kurdistan, 2005
 Resurrection of Pear Buds, Hawler, Iraqi Kurdistan, 2005

See also
 Iraqi art
 List of Iraqi artists
 List of Iraqi women artists

References

Kurdish-language writers
Iraqi Kurdish poets
1954 births
Living people
People from Kirkuk
20th-century Iraqi poets
Iraqi women poets
20th-century Iraqi writers
20th-century Iraqi women writers
21st-century Iraqi writers
21st-century Iraqi women writers
21st-century Iraqi poets